Blind Before I Stop is the fifth studio album by American singer Meat Loaf, released in September 1986. The album was produced in Germany by Frank Farian and was the first to fully embrace the '80s sound. Critics were concerned about the album missing the characteristic Steinman-influenced sound by incorporating synth chords and samples. According to Meat Loaf's 1998 autobiography, he would have preferred to wait to work with more Steinman material, but his contractual obligations with Arista required him to complete two more albums by the end of the 1980s, including this album and a live album.

Meat Loaf co-wrote three of the songs on the album. Two of them, "Blind Before I Stop" and "Rock 'n' Roll Mercenaries" were performed live on U.K. show Saturday Live, with Meat Loaf playing guitar. "Rock 'n' Roll Mercenaries", a duet with rock singer John Parr, was released as a single in the UK. Meat Loaf sang the song live with Parr on only one occasion and did not do so again after an incident just after the release of the single. During a sold-out show in London, the singer failed to introduce Parr onto the stage and Parr walked off after the song was over. Despite leaving dozens of phone messages begging for forgiveness, Meat Loaf never heard from Parr again. During his late 1980s tour of Europe, Meat Loaf picked up pianist Frank Doyle. Richard Raskin had made contributions to arrangements on previous musical tracks some years before and his style can still be heard on bass.

Music videos were created for several singles from the album, including "Getting Away with Murder" and "Rock 'n' Roll Mercenaries". Several songs from the album were featured as bonus tracks on the 1998 CD re-release of Bad Attitude in lieu of their inclusion on The Very Best of Meat Loaf compilation album released the same year.

Billboard said of "Getting Away with Murder that Meat Loaf "rocks out r&b style."  Cash Box said it could "signal a solid chart comeback for Meat Loaf" and praised the arrangement and production."

Track listing

Personnel

Band
Meat Loaf — lead vocals, backing vocals (1, 2, 6, 8), guitar (5), additional guitars (2)
John Parr — guest vocals (2)
Mats Björklynd — guitars (1, 2, 3, 8), bass (3, 6), keys, programming, drums (5, 9)
Johan Daansen — guitars (2, 7, 10)
Peter Weihe — guitars
Dieter Petereit — bass
John Golden — bass (2, 4, 5, 7, 9, 10)
Harry Baierl — piano (4, 7, 8), keyboards, programming (2)
Pit Löw — keyboards and programming
Mel Collins — saxophone (1, 3, 6)
Curt Cress — drums
Amy Goff — female vocals (9), backing vocals
Frank Farian — additional vocals (2), backing vocals (6)
Peter Bischof — vocals
Bert Gebhard — vocals
Bimey Oberreit — vocals
Elaine Goff — vocals
The Jackson Singers — choir (1, 6, 7)

Singles
"Rock 'n' Roll Mercenaries" #31 UK
"Blind Before I Stop" #89 UK
"Special Girl" #81 UK

Charts

References
 https://m.youtube.com/watch?v=SqJRrdR9VA4  Frank Farian world-wide music 45 minutes documentary

Meat Loaf albums
1986 albums
Albums produced by Frank Farian
Arista Records albums